Cridling Stubbs is a village and a civil parish in the Selby district, in the English county of North Yorkshire. It is near the town of Knottingley. Its population in 2011 was 152.

The village was historically part of the West Riding of Yorkshire until 1974.

A Romano-British hoard of 3,330 coins in a jar (the Cridling Stubbs Hoard) dating to the 4th century AD was found near the village in 1967.

Location grid

References

External links 
 DESIGN STATEMENT AND PARISH PLAN 2006, 7 May 2015, Archive copy of original

Villages in North Yorkshire
Civil parishes in North Yorkshire
Selby District